
The Cahill ministry (1956–1959) or Third Cahill ministry was the 57th ministry of the New South Wales Government, and was led by the 29th Premier, Joe Cahill, of the Labor Party. The ministry was the third of four consecutive occasions when the Government was led by Cahill, as Premier.

Cahill was first elected to the New South Wales Legislative Assembly in 1925 and served until 1932, representing the seats of St George and Arncliffe before being defeated. He was re-elected in 1935, again representing Arncliffe, and then represented Cook's River between 1941 and 1959. Having served continuously as Secretary for Public Works in the first, second, and third ministries of Jim McGirr, when Deputy Premier Jack Baddeley resigned, Cahill was appointed as McGirr's deputy on 21 September 1949. McGirr resigned as Premier several years later, on 2 April 1952, and Cahill was elected as Labor Leader and became Premier. Cahill led Labor to victory at the 1953 state election, gaining 11 seats and regaining its majority. The 1956 state election was a clear victory for Labor despite a net loss of 7 seats. The only minister from the second Cahill ministry not to be retained was Maurice O'Sullivan, while Jim Simpson was promoted to the ministry without a portfolio. There were significant changes to the distribution of portfolios, with only four ministers retaining their portfolios from the second Cahill ministry.

This ministry covers the period from 15 March 1956 when Cahill won the 1956 state election, until 1 April 1959, when Cahill led Labor to victory at the 1959 state election and the Fourth Cahill ministry was formed.

Composition of ministry
The composition of this arrangement of the ministry was announced by Cahill on 15 March 1956 following the 1956 state election and covers the period until 1 April 1959, when the 1959 state election was held. There was a minor rearrangement of the ministry in November 1957, triggered by the death of Eddie Graham, the Minister for Agriculture and Minister for Food Production.

 
Ministers are members of the Legislative Assembly unless otherwise noted.

See also

Notes

References

 

! colspan="3" style="border-top: 5px solid #cccccc" | New South Wales government ministries

New South Wales ministries
1956 establishments in Australia
1959 disestablishments in Australia
Australian Labor Party ministries in New South Wales